The 1942 NFL season was the 23rd regular season of the National Football League. Before the season, many players left for service in World War II, thus depleting the rosters of all the teams.

The Chicago Bears finished the regular season at 11–0, and faced the 10–1 Washington Redskins in the championship game. Washington, which had been beaten 73–0 in the 1940 title game, got a measure of revenge in spoiling the Bears' hope for a perfect season, winning 14–6.

Draft
The 1942 NFL Draft was held on December 22, 1941 at Chicago's Palmer House Hotel. With the first pick, the Pittsburgh Steelers selected runningback Bill Dudley from the University of Virginia.

Major rule changes
The use of flags on flexible shafts to mark the intersections of goal lines and side lines (the predecessor to the pylon) becomes mandatory.
A clarification to the offsides rule is added: The center or snapper is not offsides unless a portion of his body is ahead of the defensive team's line.
A half cannot end on a double foul. Instead, the period will be extended by one untimed down.
Detachable kicking toes are prohibited.
When an encroachment or false start causes the other team to be offsides, only the initial foul is penalized.
A forward pass that first touches an ineligible receiver may be intercepted.
If the offensive team commits pass interference in their opponent's end zone, it is an automatic touchback.

Final standings

NFL Championship Game
Washington 14, Chi. Bears 6, at Griffith Stadium, Washington, D.C., December 13, 1942

League leaders

Awards

Coaching changes
Brooklyn Dodgers: Jock Sutherland was replaced by Mike Getto.
Chicago Bears: George Halas stepped down after five games in 1942 to serve in the U.S. Navy during World War II. In his place, Hunk Anderson and Luke Johnsos served as co-coaches of the Bears.
Detroit Lions: Bill Edwards was released after three games in 1942. John Karcis served for the final eight games.

Stadium changes
 The Cleveland Rams moved from Cleveland Municipal Stadium to League Park
 The Philadelphia Eagles moved back from Philadelphia Municipal Stadium to Shibe Park, where they played in 1940

References
NFL Record and Fact Book
NFL History 1941–1950 (Last accessed December 4, 2005)
Total Football: The Official Encyclopedia of the National Football League

National Football League seasons